The Iranian Navy traditionally located in the shallow waters of the Persian Gulf, has always been the smallest of the country's military forces. An Iranian navy in one form or another has existed since Achaemenid times in 500 BC.  The Phoenician navy played an important role in the military efforts of the Persians in late antiquity in protecting and expanding trade routes along the Persian Gulf and Indian Ocean. With the Pahlavi dynasty in the 20th century that Iran began to consider building a strong navy to project its strength into the Persian Gulf and Indian Ocean. In more recent years, the country has engaged in domestic ship building industries in response to the western-backed Iraqi invasion of Iran, which left it without suppliers during an invasion.

Achaemenid Empire (525–330 BC)

Sasanian Empire (224–651)

Afsharid dynasty (1734–1750)

Qajar dynasty (1885–1925)
The modern navy of Iran was born in 1885, when steamers Persepolis and Susa were commissioned into service in the Persian Gulf.

Pahlavi dynasty (1925–1979)

The Imperial Iranian Navy (IIN) was the name of Iran's navy, until the Iranian Revolution in 1979.

It was nearly destroyed during a surprise attack by Britain and the Soviet Union in World War II, which began the Anglo-Soviet invasion of Iran. Numerous Iranian ships were sunk or damaged while still moored at their home ports.

Following World War II, the fleet began replacing destroyed warships with destroyers, frigates and many smaller vessels, including powerboats and hovercraft, many of which originated from the U.S. and UK, which had played a part in destroying much of the original equipment in World War II. In the 1970s, Iran planned to extend its naval reach into the Indian Ocean; but this goal was curtailed by the revolution, and the ensuing western-backed first Gulf War (Iran–Iraq War) (1980–1988) which left it hampered in the face of the invasion.

The Imperial Iranian Navy regained control of the Tunb and Abu Musa islands on 30 November 1971, following the British withdrawal from these islands.

Since before 1971, the navy had been supplied primarily with American and British equipment. Up until 1979, Iran rapidly modernised its navy, adding American and British-made destroyers, frigates and many smaller vessels, including hovercraft. Aircraft were also included.

During this period, Iran established an aviation capability in its navy. It was mainly equipped with American aircraft types.

Iran also had orders for more American and British naval armaments by the time of the Iranian revolution.

An  was ordered from the United Kingdom. Called , this was built in 1977 but not delivered until 1984.

Four modified s, were ordered from the United States, while eight modified s were ordered from Royal Schelde in the Netherlands. The revolution happened before any of the ships could be delivered, so, both orders were cancelled. The s then went into service with the United States Navy and were later transferred to the Republic of China (Taiwan) Navy, where they are still in service.

By 1979, the IIN had three battalions of marines.

Islamic Republic of Iran (1979–present)

With the fall of the Shah in the revolution of 1979, the Imperial Iranian Navy was renamed as the Islamic Republic of Iran Navy (IRIN). From then on, the United States imposed economic sanctions and an arms embargo, severely hampering Iran's ability to maintain and equip its navy. In fact, the navy was more severely affected than Iran's army or air force. Several of Iran's ships had to be laid up. Since 1979, the number of marines in the Islamic Republic of Iran Navy has expanded to, 2600 personnel, in two marine brigades, each composed of three battalions. These two brigades have also been reported as three battalions in the IRIN (which may be part of the Islamic Republic of Iran Army).

Iran–Iraq War
The Iran–Iraq War lasted from 1980 to 1988. The IRI Navy played a role in it. During this time, battles fought with Iraq and the United States, also degraded Iran's conventional naval assets.

Operation Morvarid was an operation launched by the Islamic Republic of Iran Navy and Air Force against the Iraqi Navy and Air Force on 28 November 1980 in response to Iraq positioning radar and monitoring equipment on the Al-Bakr and Khor-al-Amaya oil rigs to counter Iranian air operations. The operation resulted in a victory for Iran, which managed to destroy both oil rigs as well as much of the Iraqi Navy and inflicted significant damage to Iraqi ports and airfields.

On 18 April 1988, U.S. Marines, naval ships and aircraft operating within Iranian territorial waters destroyed Iranian naval and intelligence facilities on two inoperable oil platforms in the Persian Gulf, and sank at least three armed Iranian speedboats, one Iranian frigate, and one fast attack gunboat, and damaged one frigate in retaliation for the Iranian mining of the Persian Gulf and the subsequent damage to an American warship. The operation, dubbed Operation Praying Mantis, helped pressure Iran to agree to a ceasefire with Iraq later that summer, ending the eight-year conflict between the Persian Gulf neighbors.

Post-Iran–Iraq War
In place of western armaments, Iran has purchased equipment and weaponry from Russia, China, and North Korea, as well as engaging in naval exercises with Pakistan and India. The 1990s saw Iran focusing on building up its fleets of patrol boats and submarines, as well as surface-to-surface, anti-ship missiles.

Iran's goal has always been to provide escort for Iranian shipping in the Persian Gulf, as well as being able to disrupt enemy shipping, as was witnessed in the Iran–Iraq War.

In 2008, a submarine belonging to the Islamic Republic of Iran Navy reportedly docked in Assab, Eritrea.

On 22 February 2011, two Islamic Republic of Iran Navy ships entered the Suez Canal, on a deployment reported to be a training mission to Latakia, Syria. These were the tanker Kharg, and the frigate . This was the first time that Iranian naval ships had passed through the Suez Canal, since the 1979 Iranian Revolution.

On 18 February 2012, Kharg entered the Suez Canal again, with one other Iranian warship, after briefly docking at Jeddah in Saudi Arabia.

On 11 May 2020, Iranian frigate Jamaran fired a missile at Iranian support vessel Konarak. Official Iranian TV reported one fatality in the incident, while unofficial reports stated the Konarak had sunk and that there were dozens of fatalities.

On 11 June 2021, IRIS Sahand, accompanied by IRINS Makran (a naval-converted oil tanker), were the first Iranian naval ships to reach the Atlantic without docking in an international port, according to official Iranian sources. The ships are bound for Venezuela, reported to be carrying oil.

References

Navy
Islamic Republic of Iran Navy
Iran
Navy